WZKR (103.3 FM) is a radio station broadcasting in the Meridian, Mississippi, area. Since August 1, 2011, it has been an affiliate of the Supertalk Mississippi network. Previously it broadcast a country format as B103, and before that an eclectic music format as "103.3 The Art of Great Music".

External links

ZKR